"Options" is a song by NSG featuring vocals from Tion Wayne and production by Jae5. It was released on 30 November 2018 by NSG Entertainment. It peaked at number 7 on the UK Singles Chart in March 2019, and also reached number 52 on the Irish Singles Chart.

Track listing

Charts

Weekly charts

Year-end charts

Certifications

References

2018 singles
2018 songs
NSG (group) songs
Tion Wayne songs
Songs written by Tion Wayne